Joe Jitsu is a fictional police officer, one of Dick Tracys crimefighters in the 1961 syndicated animated cartoon series of the popular comic strip. He has since been criticised as a Japanese stereotype. He is named after Ju-Jitsu, a Japanese martial art. His method of subduing criminals was to grab them by the wrist, and exclaim "So solly!" and "Excuse, prease!" while repeatedly judo-flipping them on the ground violently.  The voice for this character was provided by Benny Rubin.

Both Joe Jitsu and Go Go Gomez, a Mexican stereotype, have been edited out of some reruns of the Dick Tracy cartoon series. Henry G. Saperstein, then the chairman of UPA, stated "It's just a cartoon, for goodness' sake." Others pointed out that the 'stereotypes' included two Europeans (Hemlock Holmes and Heap O'Calorie, who are British and Irish respectively), and that the Joe Jitsu character was a deliberate attempt to re-introduce a sympathetic Japanese character after the passions of the last war had died down.

In other media
Joe Jitsu makes a cameo in the Drawn Together episode "Foxxy vs. the Board of Education" and is depicted as one of the Asian students who disguised to take the SAT test in place of the other students who are using them to fake their scores.

References

Television characters introduced in 1961
Dick Tracy characters
DreamWorks Classics
UPA series and characters
Fictional American police detectives
Fictional judoka
Fictional jujutsuka
Fictional Japanese American people
Animation controversies in television
Race-related controversies in animation
Race-related controversies in television